Thomas "Red" Imrie (15 July 1937 – 24 August 2020) was a British ice hockey defender who played in the United Kingdom during the 1950s and 1960s. He also played for the Great Britain national team between 1961 and 1966. He was inducted into the British Ice Hockey Hall of Fame in 1987.

Career
Born in Falkirk, (Scotland), Imrie began playing senior ice hockey for the Falkirk Lions in the Scottish National League as a forward before he settled on defence during the first season of the British National League in 1954–55. The following season, the Lions opted to play amateur ice hockey so Imrie joined the Edinburgh Royals for the 1955–56 season. He helped them to win the Northern British League in the 1957–58 season. For the 1959–60 season, Imrie joined the Paisley Pirates. However, he was posted to southern England during his National Service and therefore finished the season with Streatham, helping them to win both the Autumn Cup and the league title.

After Streatham also opted out of ice hockey, Imrie went on to play for the Brighton Tigers, initially as captain and then as player-coach. With the Tigers, Imrie was named to the all-star teams a total of six times, both as a player and coach. Imrie then joined the Wembley Lions after the Tigers' rink closed in 1965. Imrie retired from playing when the Wembley Lions folded in 1969. When Streatham reformed in 1974 as the Redskins, Imrie became the team coach and guided them to many playoff finals, including his last season behind the bench in 1985.

After his retirement, Imrie continued to work with the Streatham second team, the Bruins, and he became a colour commentator for BBC television.

Imrie played for the Great Britain national team on three occasions: 1961, 1962 and 1966. At the 1966 tournament in Yugoslavia, he was named the World Championships Pool B Best Defenceman.

He has two daughters one of whom is called Elizabeth Imrie.  His nickname of "Red" came from a childhood incident involving two cockerspaniels, a revolving door and two buckets of red paint. It was said this incident while funny was to be held as a secret for all time, so the true details are still wholly unknown.

He died on 24 August 2020 at the age of 83.

Awards and honours
All-star A Team Defenceman in 1961–62, 1962–63 and 1964–65.
All-star B Team Defenceman in 1963–64.
All-star B Team Coach in 1963–64 and 1964–65.
Named World Championships Pool B Best Defenceman in 1966.
Inducted to the British Ice Hockey Hall of Fame in 1987.

Footnotes

References
A to Z Encyclopaedia of Ice Hockey
Ice Hockey Journalists UK

External links
A to Z Encyclopaedia of Ice Hockey entry
British Ice Hockey Hall of Fame entry

1937 births
2020 deaths
Brighton Tigers players
British Ice Hockey Hall of Fame inductees
Murrayfield Racers players
Sportspeople from Falkirk
Scottish ice hockey defencemen
Wembley Lions players